Manche was a 40-gun  of the French Navy, originally named Département de la Manche, but the name was immediately shortened to Manche around the time of her launch in April 1806.

She took part in operations in the Mauritius campaign of 1809–1811 under Captain François-Désiré Breton.

Action during Mauritius campaign of 1809-1811

Under Captain Jean Dornal de Guy, Manche captured the 16-gun gun brig , Lieutenant William Fitzwilliam Owen commanding, on 28 September 1808 near Bengkulu.

The squadron managed to re-take Foulpointe in Madagascar, captured three prizes at the action of 18 November 1809, and raided the British settlement at Tarapouly, in Sumatra.

Fate
Manche was captured during the invasion of Île de France in 1810. She was broken up as she was unfit for Royal Navy service.

References

Bibliography
 La Manche, frégate française : 1803-1810, Roger Lepelley, 1989  
 HAMELIN Emmanuel, amiral, baron (1768-1839) 
 Une mission à l'Isle de France
Winfield, Rif & Stephen S Roberts (2015) French Warships in the Age of Sail 1786 - 1861: Design Construction, Careers and Fates. (Seaforth Publishing). 

Age of Sail frigates of France
Hortense-class frigates
Ships built in France
Captured ships
1806 ships